Lake Bunot is a  volcanic crater lake and is one of the Seven Lakes of San Pablo, Laguna in the Philippines. It is located in Brgy. Concepcion, San Pablo City. Only  from the city proper, Bunot is known for its cultured tilapia and fishpens for Nilotica fingerlings.

Legend
It is said that in the Spanish Era, some Spanish soldiers came upon a quiet lagoon and wanting to know its name for surveying purposes enquired such from a man husking coconuts by the lakeshore. As is common to many Philippine etymological myths, the man misunderstood the foreign soldiers as asking for the name of the coconut husk, and replied in Tagalog Bunót. The Spaniards left muttering the word, thinking that it was the name of the lake.

External links
 Geographic data related to Lake Bunot at OpenStreetMap
 Legends of the Seven Lakes

Bunot
Bunot
Maars of the Philippines
Volcanic lakes of the Philippines